Denys Desjardins (born 1966 in Montreal, Quebec), is a film director, screenwriter, cinematographer, editor and film historian for more than twenty years. After completing studies in literature, film and communications, he directed several acclaimed films.

Career
Desjardins received the Quebec Film Critic (Association québécoise des critiques de cinéma, or AQCC) award for best short film two years in a row for La Dame aux poupées (The Doll Lady) (1996) and for Boris Lehman, filmmaker (1997), a portrait of Boris Lehman the Belgian filmmaker for whom life is a reason to make films, and making films is a reason for living. He then joined the National Film Board of Canada, where he directed Almanach 1999-2000 and My Eye for a Camera – nominated for a Jutra Award for best documentary in 2003 – as well as Being Human and Rebel with a Camera, which won him the Quebec Film Critic award for best medium-length documentary.

Desjardins has also produced and co-directed the short films Me Bob Robert and Peter and the Penny; the latter received the award for best short fiction film at the 2006 Festival Images en vue. Desjardins’ third feature-length film, The Great Resistance, was nominated for a Jutra Award for best documentary in 2008. His 2011 documentary (The Private Life of Cinema) follows the path of filmmakers who never gave up on their dream to produce feature-length fictions films and create a Quebec film industry. With Joanne Robertson, he created a web production, Making Movie History: A Portrait in 61 Parts, to celebrate the National Film Board of Canada's 75th anniversary in 2014.

Selected films

References

External links 

Biography on National Film Board of Canada web site
Desjardins' vision of cinema

Canadian documentary film directors
Film directors from Montreal
French Quebecers
1966 births
Living people